The VTB United League Coach of the Year is an annual VTB United League award given since the 2013–14 VTB United League season to the league's best coach. The award is handed out after the regular season.

Winners

Notes:
 There was no awarding in the 2019–20, because the season was cancelled due to the coronavirus pandemic in Europe.

References

External links
 VTB United League Official Website 
 VTB United League Official Website 

VTB United League awards